The following is a complete list of musical compositions by Scott Joplin ( 1867 – April 1, 1917).

Scott Joplin was born in Arkansas in around 1867, just outside Texarkana, and was a street performer before settling in Sedalia, Missouri, St. Louis, Missouri, and finally New York City where he died in 1917. He was an American composer and pianist, who achieved fame for his ragtime compositions, and was dubbed "The King of Ragtime." During his career, Joplin wrote over 40 original ragtime pieces, one ragtime ballet, and two operas. One of his first pieces, the "Maple Leaf Rag" (1899), has been recognized as the archetypal rag and influenced subsequent rag composers for thanks to its rhythmic patterns, melody lines, and harmony.

His finances were precarious throughout his career, despite a steady income from the "Maple Leaf Rag." Joplin had the majority of his works published by John Stark of Sedalia, Missouri, although he did use other lesser-known companies including his own "Scott Joplin Music Publishing Company." His first opera, A Guest of Honor, was lost after an unsuccessful tour in 1903. After the 1953 death of his widow, Lottie, a number of manuscripts of unpublished work were lost and no copies of them are known to exist.

When Joplin was learning the piano, serious musical circles condemned ragtime because of its association with the vulgar and inane songs of Tin Pan Alley. As a composer, Joplin refined ragtime, developing it from the dance music played by pianists in brothels in cities like St. Louis. This new art form, the classic rag, combined Afro-American folk music's syncopation and nineteenth-century European romanticism, with its harmonic schemes and its march-like tempos, in particular the works of John Philip Sousa. With this as a foundation, Joplin intended his compositions to be played exactly as he wrote them – without improvisation. Joplin wrote his rags as "classical" music to raise ragtime above its "cheap bordello" origins and produced work which opera historian Elise Kirk described as "...more tuneful, contrapuntal, infectious, and harmonically colorful than any others of his era."

Many inconsistencies can be found among Joplin's own titles, his subtitles, and titles printed on the covers of sheet music. For the editor of the collected works this reveals publishers' "editorial casualness" as well as a view that dance-steps in the genre could be interchangeable. Many of the works cannot be dated with certainty, and the pieces were not always submitted for copyright registration. In many cases the publication date is the only suggestion of when a piece was composed.


List

References

Bibliography

Further reading

External links

Lists of compositions by composer
African-American music

Music of St. Louis
Texas classical music
Lists of piano compositions by composer
Piano compositions by American composers
Piano compositions in the 20th century